The electoral district of Brunswick is an electorate of the Victorian Legislative Assembly. It lies within the Northern Metropolitan Region of the upper house, the Legislative Council.

Historically a very safe seat for the Labor Party, Brunswick has in recent elections seen an increase in support for the Greens, who won the seat at the 2018 election.

The seat has had three periods of existence. The seat was first formed in 1904 and abolished in 1955, recreated in 1976 and abolished again in 1992, and again re-established in 2002. It has always been held for Labor, apart from two months in 1955 when incumbent MP Peter Randles defected to the Australian Labor Party (Anti-Communist) in the Australian Labor Party split of 1955.

Brunswick was first won in 1904 by Labor candidate Frank Anstey. Anstey resigned to enter federal politics in 1910, forcing a by-election which was won by former Brunswick mayor James Jewell. Jewell was member for Brunswick for 39 years, and served for 25 years as either Government or Opposition Whip. Jewell died in office in 1949, necessitating a by-election, which was won for Labor by Peter Randles. Randles resigned from the Labor Party and joined the new Australian Labor Party (Anti-Communist) in the 1955 Labor split, but Brunswick was abolished that year and he contested and lost the new seat of Brunswick West.

The Brunswick seat was re-established in 1976, and was won by Tom Roper, the Labor member for abolished Brunswick West, who would hold it until it was abolished again in 1992. Roper held a number of prominent ministries in the Cain government, including Minister for Health (1982–1985), Minister for Transport (1985–1987) and Minister for Planning and Environment (1987–1990), and was then promoted to Treasurer in the Kirner Ministry (1990–1992). Upon the abolition of Brunswick, Roper contested and won the adjacent seat of Coburg at the 1992 election.

In 2002, Brunswick was re-created for a third time, and was won by Carlo Carli, who had succeeded Roper as member for Coburg; Carli represented Brunswick until his retirement at the 2010 state election. City of Yarra mayor Jane Garrett held the seat for Labor despite a high-profile campaign by the Victorian Greens, who received a significant swing in their favour. Garrett retained the seat in 2014 in the face of a similarly strong campaign. Labor won government under Daniel Andrews at the 2014 election, and Garrett was promoted into the new Andrews Ministry as Minister for Consumer Affairs, Gaming and Liquor Regulation and Minister for Emergency Services. The seat was won by Greens candidate Tim Read at the 2018 Victorian Election.

Members for Brunswick

Election results

External links
 Electorate profile: Brunswick, Victorian Electoral Commission

Notes

Electoral districts of Victoria (Australia)
1904 establishments in Australia
1955 disestablishments in Australia
1976 establishments in Australia
1992 disestablishments in Australia
2002 establishments in Australia
City of Yarra
City of Merri-bek
Fitzroy, Victoria
Electoral districts and divisions of Greater Melbourne